Pour ceux qui dorment les yeux ouverts (For those who sleep with their eyes open) is an extended play by Congolese-French rapper Gims, which was released on 7 December 2006.

It was also Gims's first solo project produced by Wati B. He also participated with the group Sexion d'Assaut in some songs. The disc contains nine songs.

Background 
In parallel with his career with Sexion d'Assaut, Gims tried his hand at musical composition. At the end of 2006, he released his first solo project, a maxi entitled Pour ceux qui dorment les yeux ouverts.

The extended play was produced by ATK's Fredy K and Noko. With very few copies pressed, the disc aimed to make Gims known to the general public. The record features tracks with Sexion d'Assaut, Scred Connexion rapper Koma and a singer named Carole.

Track listing 
 "Eh Merde!" – 4:18
 "L'Arrière Plan" – 4:41
 "Je Dors Les Yeux Ouverts" (featuring Koma) – 3:48
 "L'Èspéciment De L'Espèce Humaine" (featuring Carole) – 3:38
 "Tsunami permanent" (featuring Sexion d'Assaut) – 3:47
 "Sale Époque" – 4:13
 "M'Arrêter" – 3:50
 "Derniere épreuve" – 4:30
 "Du Coq à l'Ane" – 5:29

Release history

References

Gims albums
2006 EPs